Ma Huihui (born 12 August 1989) is a Chinese para-badminton player who has played each of the three variations of the sport (women's singles, women's doubles, and mixed doubles) at the highest world level.

In 2021, Ma Huihui won a silver medal representing China in the women's doubles SL3–SU5 event of the 2020 Summer Paralympics alongside Cheng Hefang, having lost to Leani Ratri Oktila and Khalimatus Sadiyah in the gold medal match.

Achievements

Paralympic Games
Women's singles SL4

Women's doubles SL3–SU5

World Championships 
Women's singles

Women’s doubles

Asian Para Games 
Women's singles

Women’s doubles

Asian Championships 
Women's singles

Women's doubles

Mixed doubles

International Tournaments (9 titles, 6 runners-up) 
Women's singles

Women's doubles

References

Notes

1989 births
Living people
Chinese female badminton players
Chinese para-badminton players
Paralympic badminton players of China
Badminton players at the 2020 Summer Paralympics
Paralympic medalists in badminton
Paralympic silver medalists for China
Paralympic bronze medalists for China
Medalists at the 2020 Summer Paralympics